Cochrane is a Chilean town and commune in Capitán Prat Province of the Aisén Region. According to the 2002 census it has a population of 2,867. The urban population in 2002 was 2,217 and the rural population was 650.

Cochrane was founded in 1954 (as Pueblo Nuevo), but didn't have road access to the rest of Chile until 1988, when the Carretera Austral was opened.  The town was later named Cochrane in honour of Thomas Cochrane, 10th Earl of Dundonald, a British naval captain and radical politician who was appointed the first Admiral of the Chilean Navy in 1818 and made a major contribution to winning independence for the young nation from Spain. Cochrane remains the southernmost town along the highway, with only a few villages south of it, among them Caleta Tortel and Villa O'Higgins. Cochrane is just south of the newly established Patagonia National Park. The center of town includes a park surrounded by various shops, including a general store, a bakery, a small supermarket, a tourist information kiosk, and more.

Nearby is the prominent peak of Monte San Lorenzo, also known as Cerro Cochrane.

Demographics
Of these, 2,217 (77.3%) lived in urban areas and 650 (22.7%) in rural areas. The population fell by 4.3% (129 persons) between the 1992 and 2002 censuses.

Administration
As a commune, Cochrane is a third-level administrative division of Chile administered by a municipal council, headed by an alcalde who is directly elected every four years. The 2008-2012 alcalde is Patricio Ulloa Georgia (UDI).  The council has the following members:
 María Quijanes Millao (PRSD)
 Lindor Lopez Cruces (RN)
 Jorge Patricio Abello Moll (ILC)
 Patricia Quintana Cruces (ILE)
 Tatiana Aguilera Lopez (ILC)
 Andres Chavarria Alarcon (ILE)

Within the electoral divisions of Chile, Cochrane is represented in the Chamber of Deputies by René Alinco (PDC) and David Sandoval (UDI) as part of the 59th electoral district, which includes the entire Aisén Region. The commune is represented in the Senate by Antonio Horvath Kiss (RN) and Patricio Walker Prieto (PDC) as part of the 18th senatorial constituency (18).

Climate 
Cochrane has an oceanic climate (Köppen Cfb) with drying trend in summer. Owing to its location in a valley behind the Northern Patagonian Ice Field, it is shielded from the heavy rainfall caused by the Humboldt Current, but the precipitation is still relatively abundant and able to support forest, unlike further east in Argentinian Patagonia.

References

External links
  Municipality of Cochrane
 Information in English

Communes of Chile
Populated places established in 1954
Populated places in Capitán Prat Province
1954 establishments in Chile